Elijah Nkala (born 7 July 1964) is a Zimbabwean sprinter. He competed in the men's 400 metres at the 1988 Summer Olympics.

References

1964 births
Living people
Athletes (track and field) at the 1988 Summer Olympics
Zimbabwean male sprinters
Olympic athletes of Zimbabwe
Place of birth missing (living people)